Melanotan II is a synthetic analogue of the peptide hormone α-melanocyte-stimulating hormone (α-MSH) that stimulates melanogenesis and increases sexual arousal. It can be used to prevent sunlight-induced skin cancer by stimulating skin tanning.

It was under development as drug candidate for female sexual dysfunction and erectile dysfunction but clinical development ceased by 2003, and as of 2018, no product containing melanotan II was marketed and all commercial development had ceased.

Unlicensed, untested, or fraudulent products sold as "melanotan II" are found on the Internet, and purported to be effective as "tanning drugs", though side effects such as uneven pigmentation (it makes already uneven pigmentation more noticeable), new nevi (moles), and darkening or enlargement of existing moles have been reported and have led to medical authorities discouraging its use.  There has been no scientific study into the long term and permanent side effects the use of this peptide may cause.

Synthesis
In the synthesis of melanotan II, an ε-amino group of lysine and an γ-carboxy group of aspartic acid have their orthogonal protection removed before undergoing a carbodiimide mediated lactamization, leading to an intermediate. This intermediate, when attached to N-acetylnorleucine, forms melanotan II. The entire process can be accomplished in 12 steps with an overall yield of 2.6%, and the product is more than 90% pure without preparative chromatography.

Mechanism of action
Melanotan II acts as a non-selective agonist of the melanocortin receptors MC1, MC3, MC4, and MC5.

Melanotan II produces melanogenesis by activation of the MC1 receptor, whereas its clinically documented sexual effects are thought to be related to its ability to activate the MC4 receptor (though the MC3 is thought to also possibly be involved).

Other effects of melanotan II, mostly regarded as adverse effects, include flushing, nausea, vomiting, stretching, yawning, and loss of appetite (the last via activation of MC4).

History
Research in the early 1960s showed that in rats, administration of α-MSH caused sexual arousal, and work on this continued in many labs up through the 1980s, when scientists at the University of Arizona began attempting to develop α-MSH and analogs as potential sunless tanning agents, and synthesized and tested several analogs, including melanotan-I and melanotan II.

Early in the research process one of the scientists, who was conducting experiments on himself with an early tool compound, melanotan II, injected himself with twice the dose he intended to and got an eight-hour erection, along with nausea and vomiting.

As a tanning agent, melanotan I (now known as afamelanotide) was licensed by Competitive Technologies, a technology transfer company operating on behalf of the University of Arizona, to an Australian startup called Epitan, which changed its name to Clinuvel in 2006.
 
As a sexual dysfunction agent, melanotan II was licensed by Competitive Technologies to Palatin Technologies.   Palatin ceased development of melanotan II in 2000 and synthesized, patented, and began to develop bremelanotide, a likely metabolite of melanotan II that differs in that it has a hydroxyl group where melanotan II has an amide. Competitive Technologies sued Palatin for breach of contract and tried to claim ownership of bremelanotide; the parties settled in 2008 with Palatin retaining rights to bremelanotide, returning rights to melanotan II to Competitive Technologies, and paying US$800,000.

Society and culture
Numerous products are sold online and in gyms and beauty salons as "melanotan" or "melanotan-1" or "melanotan-2" in their marketing.

The unregulated products are not legal to be sold for human usage in any jurisdiction.

Starting in 2007, health agencies in various countries began issuing warnings against their use.

See also 
 Methoxsalen

References 

Melanocortin receptor agonists
Peptides
Abandoned drugs
Aphrodisiacs